Hualien Airport  is a commercial airport located in an  civilian area of Chiashan Air Force Base in Xincheng, Hualien County, Taiwan. With flights to Taipei, Kaohsiung and Taichung, it served 235,386 passengers in 2017, making it the tenth-busiest airport in Taiwan.

History
The airport was opened on 16 May 1962, for military and domestic civilian use. Before this, Hualien was a military gravel airfield.

On 27 April 2001, Hualien Airport became certified to serve international flights, specifically charter flights to and from Japan (to nearby Yonaguni in particular). The first Japanese charter arrived at Hualien on 1 October 2001. Charter flights to South Korea and Macau began in August and October 2004 respectively. However, these routes have since ended. There was also discussion of using Hualien for charter flights to mainland China under the Three Links scheme.

The proximity of Hualien Airport to a military base has caused some tension between travellers, airline officials, and the Republic of China Air Force, especially when civilian flights are cancelled due to war games exercises.

Accidents and incidents
On 26 October 1989, China Airlines Flight 204 crashed into a mountain shortly after takeoff from Hualien Airport. All 54 passengers and crew on board died.
On 24 August 1999, Uni Air Flight 873 flight from Taipei carrying 96 passengers and crew exploded just after it landed at Hualien. The blast injured 28 people and killed one, although a pregnant woman miscarried days later. An investigation revealed that former Taiwanese decathlete Ku Chin-shui, who was not aboard the flight, had given two bleach bottles containing gasoline to his nephew to transport, which exploded when exposed wires attached to a motorcycle battery in the same overhead bin as the gasoline sparked after being jostled during the landing. Ku was convicted in 2002 and sentenced to seven and a half years in prison, but a later trial upon his appeal found him not guilty on 27 December 2004.

Expansion

Because Hualien City is a popular gateway into Taroko National Park, the airport became too small and outdated for the growing number of tourists. As a result, it underwent a significant expansion between 2002 and 2005 in anticipation of increased traffic from international charters and in an effort to spur local economic development. Plans called for new passenger and cargo terminals, new air bridges, and a new apron. 

The new passenger terminal was opened on 19 March 2004, at a cost of NT$2.3 billion (US$69 million). It incorporates design cues from both classical Chinese and Aboriginal Taiwanese architecture, though the building overall has a modern look with copious use of granite, marble, steel, and glass. Hualien's terminal is one of only three airport terminals in Taiwan whose layout allows aviation enthusiasts clear views of takeoffs and landings (the other two being Taiwan Taoyuan International Airport and Kaohsiung International Airport.

Airlines and destinations

Transportation
The airport is accessible within walking distance south-east of  railway station. Local bus 1123 operates a loop between the airport,  station and Hualien City.

See also
 Civil Aeronautics Administration (Taiwan)
 Transportation in Taiwan
 List of airports in Taiwan

References

External links 

 
Hualien Air Base, Federation of American Scientists

1962 establishments in Taiwan
Airports established in 1962
Airports in Taiwan
Buildings and structures in Hualien County
Transportation in Hualien County